Oru Vasantha Geetham is a 1994 Indian Tamil-language film written and directed by T. Rajendar. Rajender himself appeared in the lead role with Gautami. The film released on 4 May 1994.

Plot

Cast 
T. Rajendar
Gautami
Janagaraj
Silk Smitha
S. S. Chandran
Radharavi
Silambarasan as Silambhu
Kuralarasan

Soundtrack 
Soundtrack was composed by T. Rajender who also wrote lyrics.
"Aangaari" – SPB
"Kalyanam" – SPB
"Mainave" – SPB
"Puguntha Veedu" – SPB
"Thanneerindri" – K. S. Chithra
"Thotta Chinungi" – SPB, Chithra
"Thenpodhigai" – SPB

Legacy 
The scene where Rajendar's character argues with Gautami in court attained popularity for Rajendar's English dialogue: "Sorry for the interruption. This is only my introduction. During the cross examination, you will see my action-cum-direction, added with perfection. In the name of the witness, you are playing with imitation. That’s my conception".

References

External links 
 

1990s Tamil-language films
1994 films
Films directed by T. Rajendar
Films scored by T. Rajendar
Films with screenplays by T. Rajendar